Folda may refer to:

Places
 Folda, Angus, a hamlet in Angus, Scotland
 Folda, Nordland, a fjord in Nordland county, Norway
 Folda (Rindal), a river in Møre og Romsdal and Trøndelag counties in Norway
 Folda, Trøndelag, a firth and fjord in Trøndelag county, Norway
 Folda Bridge, a bridge over the Foldafjord in Trøndelag county, Norway

People
Jaroslav Folda, a historian specializing on the Middle Ages
John Folda, an American Catholic bishop